Richard Curtin may refer to:
 Richard Curtin (rower)
 Richard Curtin (economist)